James Bond (born 5 July 1938) is a British former motorcycle speedway rider who rode for Wolverhampton Wolves, Swindon Robins, and Long Eaton Archers.

Biography
Bond was born in Sutton Coldfield in 1938. He competed in cycle speedway for Sutton Coldfield Stars before taking up the motorized form. He undertook his national service in 1960, joining the Royal Corps of Signals and training as a despatch rider before joining the Royal Signals Motorcycle Display Team, performing around the UK and at Madison Square Gardens. He first rode in speedway as a junior in 1961, moving into the Wolverhampton Wolves team in 1963, the year that the Wolves won the Provincial League. Nicknamed "007" in reference to his fictional namesake, he was a regular member of the Wolves team until 1971 when he moved to the Swindon Robins. After two seasons with the Robins, he spent a season with the Long Eaton Archers before retiring at the end of 1974.

Bond represented England against Australia in 1969. He won the first indoor speedway event to be staged in Leicester, the Midland Riders Championship at the Granby Halls in 1971.

Career record

All figures relate to the British League.

†Division two

References

1938 births
Living people
British speedway riders
Wolverhampton Wolves riders
Swindon Robins riders
Long Eaton Archers riders
20th-century British Army personnel
Royal Corps of Signals soldiers